Donga may refer to:
Donga Department, a department of Benin 
Donga, Nigeria, a town and Local Government Area in Taraba State, Nigeria
Donga River, a river of Nigeria and Cameroon
Donga Range, a mountain range in Bhutan, Lower Himalayan Range 
Donga (film), a 1985 Telugu-Indian film starring Chiranjeevi
Donga (magazine), a South African literary magazine 1976–1978
The Dong-a Ilbo or DongA, a newspaper in South Korea
Dong-a University, a South Korean university
Donga (musician), recorder of Brazilian samba
Donga, a form of stick-fighting pioneered by the Nilotic Surma people
Donga, a portable building used for temporary accommodation in Australia

See also

Donka (disambiguation)
 Dongas, a tribe of UK road protesters